The London Fire Department (LFD) provides fire prevention, life preservation, and technical rescue services to the city of London, Ontario, Canada.

History 
A volunteer fire department was formed in 1842, two years following the incorporation of the village of London. The first fire station was erected on Carling Street in 1847.

The volunteer department was replaced by the permanent London Fire Department on April 1, 1873, following the Great Fire of London in 1845 which destroyed over 300 buildings. The department has since run 24 hours a day and seven days a week. Firefighters with the London Fire Department are all members of the London Professional Fire Firefighters Association, Local 142 of the IAFF.

Operations

Apparatus 
The London Fire Department has a diverse apparatus fleet laid out across the city's 14 fire stations. Various vehicles perform specialized tasks to fight fires, prevent injury, and preserve life.

*Spare vehicles are italicized.

Teams 

In addition to standard firefighting and rescue services, some employees of LFD further divided into four specialized teams: ice/water rescue, hazardous materials, technical/rope rescue, and fire communications.

Budget 
As per the 2020-2023 Multi-Year Budget, the London Fire Department's services and assets are paid for by the taxpayers of London at an approximate rate of 80 cents a day per citizen.

Included in the budget is funding for London's new Fire Station 15, built to serve the southeast part of the city (specifically the growing Summerside area). Station 15, which will cost approximately $3.85 million to build, is planned to open in 2023, and will include a hybrid, dual-purpose engine and ladder truck known as a quint.

References 

Fire departments in Ontario
Municipal government of London, Ontario